Peridynamics is a formulation of continuum mechanics that is oriented toward deformations with discontinuities, especially fractures.

Purpose

The peridynamic theory is based on integral equations, in contrast with the classical theory of continuum mechanics, which is based on partial differential equations. Since partial derivatives do not exist on crack surfaces and other singularities, the classical equations of continuum mechanics cannot be applied directly when such features are present in a deformation. The integral equations of the peridynamic theory can be applied directly, because they do not require partial derivatives.

The ability to apply the same equations directly at all points in a mathematical model of a deforming structure helps the peridynamic approach avoid the need for the special techniques of fracture mechanics. For example, in peridynamics, there is no need for a separate crack growth law based on a stress intensity factor.

Definition and basic terminology
The basic equation of peridynamics is the following equation of motion:

 is a dummy variable of integration.

The function  is called the "pairwise force function" and contains all the constitutive (material-dependent) properties. It describes how the internal forces depend on the deformation.

The physical mechanism in this interaction need not be specified.

The term "peridynamic," an adjective, was proposed in the year 2000 and comes from the prefix peri, which means all around, near, or surrounding; and the root dyna, which means force or power. The term "peridynamics," a noun, is a shortened form of the phrase peridynamic model of solid mechanics.

Pairwise force functions
Using the abbreviated notation  and 
Newton's third law places the following restriction on :

for any . This equation states that

A pairwise force function is specified by a graph of  versus bond elongation , defined by

A schematic of a pairwise force function for the bond connecting two typical points is shown in the following figure:

Damage
Damage is incorporated in the pairwise force function by allowing bonds to break when their elongation exceeds some prescribed value. After a bond breaks, it no longer sustains any force, and the endpoints are effectively disconnected from each other. When a bond breaks, the force it was carrying is redistributed to other bonds that have not yet broken. This increased load makes it more likely that these other bonds will break. The process of bond breakage and load redistribution, leading to further breakage, is how cracks grow in the peridynamic model.

Peridynamic states

The theory described above assumes that each peridynamic bond responds independently of all the others. This is an oversimplification for most materials and leads to restrictions on the types of materials that can be modeled. In particular, this assumption implies that any isotropic linear elastic solid is restricted to a Poisson ratio of 1/4.

To address this lack of generality, the idea of "peridynamic states" was introduced. This allows the force density in each bond to depend on the stretches in all the bonds connected to its endpoints, in addition to its own stretch. For example, the force in a bond could depend on the net volume changes at the endpoints. The effect of this volume change, relative to the effect of the bond stretch, determines the Poisson ratio. With peridynamic states, any material that can be modeled within the standard theory of continuum mechanics can be modeled as a peridynamic material, while retaining the advantages of the peridynamic theory for fracture.

One can find extended discussion of the integral form of equations of solid body mechanics and restrictions on the form of kernel in I.A.Kunin “Theory of elastic media with microstructure. Nonlocal theory of elasticity. 1975 (In Russian); I. A. Kunin, Elastic Media with Microstructure I. One-Dimensional Models (Springer, Berlin, 1982); I. A. Kunin, Elastic Media with Microstructure II. Three-Dimensional Models (Springer, Berlin, 1983)(In English).

See also
 Fracture mechanics
 Continuum mechanics
 Movable cellular automaton

External links
 Peridigm, an open-source computational peridynamics code
 website on peridynamics
 PeriDoX open-source repository for peridynamics and its documentation
 Implementation of finite element and finite difference approximation of Nonlocal models

Continuum mechanics
Fracture mechanics